Bronisław Bula (born 28 September 1946 in Ruda Śląska) is a Polish former footballer. He played 26 times for Poland, scoring five goals.

References

weltfussball.de

1946 births
Living people
Polish footballers
Poland international footballers
Ruch Chorzów players
FC Rouen players
Expatriate footballers in France
Ligue 1 players
Ligue 2 players
Polish expatriate footballers
Sportspeople from Ruda Śląska
Arras FA players
Association football midfielders
20th-century Polish people